Sue Scott may refer to:

 Sue Scott (actress), American actress and character voice actor
 Sue Scott (politician) (born 1954), member of the Arkansas House of Representatives
 Sue Scott (sociologist), British sociologist, Professor at Glasgow Caledonian University
 Sue Reeve (née Scott, born 1951), British long jumper and hurdler

See also 
 Susan Scott (disambiguation)